The men's 100 metres event at the 2020 Summer Olympics took place on 31 July and 1 August 2021 at the Olympic Stadium. 84 athletes were expected to compete; 27 nations used universality places to enter athletes in addition to the 56 qualifying through standard time or ranking (23 universality places were used in 2016). 78 athletes from 59 nations competed. Marcell Jacobs won the gold medal, establishing twice, semifinal and final, the new European record, Italy's first medal in the men's 100 metres. The United States extended its podium streak in the event to six Games with Fred Kerley's silver, only third at the US Trials. Canadian Andre De Grasse won his second consecutive bronze medal in the 100 metres establishing his personal best. With Usain Bolt retired, Jamaica's three-Games gold medal streak ended.

Summary
Former 400 metres specialist (ranked #8 of all time) USA's Fred Kerley won the first semi-final, with 
defending bronze medalist Andre De Grasse from Canada qualifying as second. In the second semi-final American world leader and gold medal favourite Trayvon Bromell was pipped in a photofinish by Enoch Adegoke of Nigeria, who came in second behind Zharnel Hughes of Great Britain, the current European Champion.

In the third semi-final China's Su Bingtian got a blistering start and held off the group to improve his own Asian record by 0.08 to 9.83, concurrently setting the unofficial 60 metres world best. Two thousandths behind, Ronnie Baker from USA also improved his personal best, both men timed at 9.83 and tied for #12 on the all time list. Italy's Marcell Jacobs, who had arrived at the event as the 60 metres world leader, came in a close third and was timed at 9.84, setting the European record, improving his PB by 0.1 and equalling 1996 champion Donovan Bailey for #14. Jacobs qualified for the final on time along with the second pre-Olympics favorite, African record holder Akani Simbine of South Africa who qualified with 9.90. Bromell, having run a time of 10.00, was eliminated in what was considered a significant upset.

The center lanes of the final included the three heat winners Su, Kerley and Hughes and fastest second Baker.

Hughes bolted early for a clear false start, with all runners except Jacobs sprinting from the blocks after him, and was disqualified. The second start was clean: Su could not repeat his great semi-final start, with Kerley having the fastest reaction time and leading the race until about the 70 m mark, where he was passed by a resurgent Jacobs. From there, Jacobs opened up space on the group, with Kerley staying the closest as Adegoke pulled up lame, while De Grasse, after running last, accelerated and passed Baker and Simbine at the 90 metres mark to take his second bronze medal in the event. Jacobs had the clear win over Kerley and was immediately cheered by Gianmarco Tamberi, who had just won the high jump event just 13 minutes earlier. The two hugged and celebrated an iconic moment in Italian Olympic history.

Jacobs was timed at 9.80 for an unexpected Olympic victory. This marked his second improvement of the European record in just a few hours, tying Steve Mullings for #10 of all time. Kerley and De Grasse both improved their wind-legal personal best results to 9.84 and 9.89 respectively.

Background
This was the twenty-ninth time the event was held, having appeared at every Olympics since the first in 1896.

The Democratic Republic of the Congo, Nauru, the Refugee Olympic Team, Slovakia, and Tajikistan each made their men's 100 metres debut. The United States made its 28th appearance in the event, the most of any country, having missed only the boycotted 1980 Games.

Qualification

A National Olympic Committee (NOC) could enter up to 3 qualified athletes in the men's 100 metres event if all athletes meet the entry standard or qualify by ranking during the qualifying period. (The limit of 3 has been in place since the 1930 Olympic Congress.) The qualifying standard is 10.05 seconds. This standard was "set for the sole purpose of qualifying athletes with exceptional performances unable to qualify through the IAAF World Rankings pathway." The world rankings, based on the average of the best five results for the athlete over the qualifying period and weighted by the importance of the meet, will then be used to qualify athletes until the cap of 56 is reached.

The qualifying period was originally from 1 May 2019 to 29 June 2020. Due to the COVID-19 pandemic, the period was suspended from 6 April 2020 to 30 November 2020, with the end date extended to 29 June 2021. The world rankings period start date was also changed from 1 May 2019 to 30 June 2020; athletes who had met the qualifying standard during that time were still qualified, but those using world rankings would not be able to count performances during that time. The qualifying time standards could be obtained in various meets during the given period that have the approval of the IAAF. Only outdoor meets were eligible for the sprints and short hurdles, including the 100 metres. The most recent Area Championships may be counted in the ranking, even if not during the qualifying period. Races with wind above 2.0 m/s were not included.

NOCs can also use their universality place—each NOC can enter one male athlete regardless of time if they had no male athletes meeting the entry standard for an athletics event—in the 100 metres.

Entry number: 56 (17 from Ranking) + 27 Universality and 1 Invitational. Some sprinters, like Aaron Brown, have been withdrawn (see note #11).

Competition format
The event continued to use the preliminaries plus three main rounds format introduced in 2012. Athletes not meeting the qualification standard (that is, were entered through universality places) competed in the preliminaries; those who met the standard started in the first round.

Records
Prior to this competition, the existing world and Olympic records were as follows.

The following national records were established during the competition:

Schedule

All times are Japan Standard Time (UTC+9)

The men's 100 metres took place over two consecutive days.

Results

Preliminaries 
Qualification Rules: First 3 in each heat (Q) and the next 1 fastest (q) advance to Round 1.

Preliminary heat 1

Preliminary heat 2

Preliminary heat 3

Round 1 
Qualification Rules: First 3 in each heat (Q) and the next 3 fastest (q) advance to the semifinals.

Heat 1

Heat 2

Heat 3

Heat 4

Heat 5

Heat 6

Heat 7

Semifinals 
Qualification Rules: First 2 in each heat (Q) and the next 2 fastest (q) advance to the Final.

Semifinal 1

Semifinal 2

Semifinal 3

Final

References

Men's 100 metres
2020
Men's events at the 2020 Summer Olympics